El Picacho is a corregimiento in Olá District, Coclé Province, Panama with a population of 331 as of 2010. Its population as of 1990 was 307; its population as of 2000 was 348.

References

Corregimientos of Coclé Province